Kelituiyeh (also Romanized as Kelītū’īyeh and Kalītūyeh; also known as Chehchoo, Kalato, Kalātū, Kelātū, and Kelī Tū) is a village in Kuh Shah Rural District, Ahmadi District, Hajjiabad County, Hormozgan Province, Iran. At the 2006 census, its population was 162, in 41 families.

References 

Populated places in Hajjiabad County